Bathysolen is a genus of true bugs belonging to the family Coreidae. The species of this genus are found in Europe

Species
The following species are recognised in the genus Bathysolen:
 Bathysolen poppii Bergevin, 1913
 Bathysolen nubilus (Fallén, 1807)

References

Coreidae